"A Bus for a Bus on the Bus" is the debut single by English rock band Cardiacs, then known as Cardiac Arrest, released in 1979 under Tortch Records. The song's title recalls "A Pound for a Brown on the Bus" from the Mothers of Invention album Uncle Meat (1969).

Until the release of The Special Garage Concerts Vol II, none of the tracks on the 7-inch single had been reproduced anywhere else. The single was supposed to contain four tracks and not three, but the limited space on the 7-inch format prevented it. The fourth track was to be "Keep Your Dead Mice with You", which was later re-recorded as "Dead Mouse" on the Toy World album. The single is one of the rarest Cardiacs items.

Recording 

According to Pugh, Jim Smith broke the E string on his bass during recording. Before recording Cade bought some children's items from a newsagent and brought them to the session. Smith proceeded to give each member a different item and conducted them like an orchestra to make noises on "A Cake for Bertie's Party" during the middle section. During the recording of "Keep Your Dead Mice With You", which was at the end of the session, Smith and Pugh tried to put together a vocal harmony but it was not finished. The songs were mixed at the end of the session and 1000 copies were pressed.

Reissues and alternate versions of tracks

Cardiac Arrest E.P. has never been reissued, and thus is one of the rarest Cardiacs releases. None of the tracks have ever been reissued from the original master, although tracks have had live versions appearing on other albums.

All three tracks were performed live on the 2005 live album The Special Garage Concerts Vol II
Versions of "A Bus for a Bus on the Bus" and "A Cake for Bertie's Party" appeared on the 2017 DVD Some Fairytales From the Rotten Shed.
The band SlapPeR released a version of the song in aid of Tim Smith in January 2020.

Track listing
A1. "A Bus for a Bus on the Bus" (Tim Smith, Michael Pugh) – 4:33
B2. "A Cake for Bertie's Party" (T. Smith, Jim Smith, Colvin Mayers) – 3:10
B3. "Food on the Wall" (Mayers) – 1:08

Personnel
According to Eric Benac:
 Philip Pilf (Tim Smith) – guitar, vocals
 Patty Pilf (Jim Smith) – bass
 Peter Boker (Michael Pugh) – vocals
 Duncan Doilet (Colvin Mayers) – keyboards
 Richard Targett (Peter Tagg) – drums
 Raphael Cadd (Ralph Cade) – saxophone, triangle

Notes

References 

Cardiacs songs
1979 singles
1979 songs
Songs written by Tim Smith (Cardiacs)